Firelight is a pop/folk-band founded in 2013 by vocalist Richard Edwards Micallef in Malta. Michelle Mifsud (vocals and piano), Wayne Williams (vocals, keys and guitar) and Daniel (guitars) are all Richard's siblings. The band is completed by Tony Polidano (bass) and Leslie Decesare (drums). 

Firelight's style is a mix of pop, rock, country and folk. Richard plays the Appalachian dulcimer, an American traditional instrument related to the European zither. 

Firelight represented Malta in the 2014 Eurovision Song Contest in Denmark with their song "Coming Home", placing 23rd out of 26 with 32 points, receiving 12 points from the jury selections from Armenia and the UK..

Firelight released their first album called "Backdrop Of Life" in October 2014.

Band members
Michelle Mifsud – vocals, piano, percussion
Richard Edward Micallef – vocals, acoustic guitar, Appalachian dulcimer, percussion
Tony Polidano – vocals, upright bass, electric bass, acoustic bass, percussion
Daniel Micallef – acoustic guitar, electric guitar
Leslie Decesare – drums, percussion, harmonica
Wayne Williams -vocals, acoustic guitar, keyboards

Discography

Album

Singles

References

Eurovision Song Contest entrants for Malta
Eurovision Song Contest entrants of 2014